The large-disced litter-skink (Lygisaurus aeratus) is a species of skink found in Queensland in Australia.

References

Lygisaurus
Reptiles described in 1901
Skinks of Australia
Endemic fauna of Australia
Taxa named by Samuel Garman